Major Chandrakanth may refer to:

Major Chandrakanth (play), by K. Balachander
Major Chandrakanth (1966 film), Tamil film directed by K. Balachander
Major Chandrakanth (1993 film), Telugu film directed by K. Raghavendra Rao